Jimmy Connors was the defending champion, but did not participate this year.

Unseeded Vincent Van Patten won the tournament, beating Mark Edmondson in the final, 6–2, 3–6, 6–3.

Seeds

Draw

Finals

Top half

Bottom half

External links
 Main draw

1981 Grand Prix (tennis)
Tokyo Indoor